Group 1 of UEFA Euro 1988 contained West Germany, Italy, Spain, and Denmark. Matches were played from 10 to 17 June 1988.

Teams

Standings

In the semi-finals,
The winner of Group 1, West Germany, advanced to play the runner-up of Group 2, Netherlands.
The runner-up of Group 1, Italy, advanced to play the winner of Group 2, Soviet Union.

Matches

West Germany vs Italy

Denmark vs Spain

West Germany vs Denmark

Italy vs Spain

West Germany vs Spain

Italy vs Denmark

References

External links
UEFA Euro 1988 Group 1

UEFA Euro 1988
Group
Group
Group
Group